Sir Robert Clarke, 2nd Baronet (1683 – November 1746) was a British politician who sat in the House of Commons from 1717 to 1722.

Early life
Clarke was the elder son of Sir Samuel Clarke, 1st Baronet of Snailwell and his wife Mary Thompson, daughter of Robert Thompson of Newington Green, Middlesex. In 1719, he succeeded his father as baronet. He was admitted at Sidney Sussex College, Cambridge on 12 December 1701, aged 18 and was also admitted at Gray's Inn in 1701. He married Mary Barnardiston, only daughter of Arthur Barnardiston of Hoxton in around 1712.

Political career
Clarke was returned unopposed as a Whig Member of Parliament (MP) for Cambridgeshire at a by election on 18 November 1717. He was defeated at the 1722 general election, and never stood again.

Family
Clarke died in November 1746. By his wife he had ten children. He was succeeded in the baronetcy successively by his sons Samuel and Robert. After the death of his last surviving son Arthur, the sixth baronet, the title became extinct.

References

1683 births
1746 deaths
Baronets in the Baronetage of England
British MPs 1715–1722
Members of Gray's Inn
Members of the Parliament of Great Britain for English constituencies
Clarke baronets